Şıra, şire, or sira is a Turkish non-alcoholic drink made from slightly fermented grape juice. It tastes sweet due to the high fructose it contains. Its colour is terracotta. It's mostly served with İskender kebap. A flavored version of şıra is served in the Marmara Region with the name of hardaliye. Hardaliye is basically a şıra aromatized in mustard seeds and cherry leaves for 15 days. Hardaliye is usually served in special occasions as an appetizer.

References

Turkish words and phrases
Turkish inventions
Turkish cuisine